The men's 50 metre freestyle event at the 2014 Commonwealth Games as part of the swimming programme took place on 28 and 29 July at the Tollcross International Swimming Centre in Glasgow, Scotland.

The medals were presented by David Downie, President of Scottish Swimming and the quaichs were presented by Mike Summers, Chairman of the Falkland Islands Overseas Games Association.

Records
Prior to this competition, the existing world and Commonwealth Games records were as follows.

The following records were established during the competition:

Results

Heats

Semifinals

Final

References

External links

Men's 0050 metre freestyle
Commonwealth Games